Sébastien Bisaillon (born December 8, 1986) is a Canadian former professional ice hockey defenceman who played 2 games in the National Hockey League with the Edmonton Oilers during the 2006–07 season. The rest of his career, which lasted from 2007 to 2022, was mainly spent in the French Ligue Magnus.

Playing career
Bisaillon was born in Mont-Laurier, Quebec. As a youth, he played in the 2000 Quebec International Pee-Wee Hockey Tournament with the Sélects-du-Nord minor ice hockey team. 

Bisaillon was signed as a free agent by the Edmonton Oilers on September 27, 2006. Due to a rash of injuries, Bisaillon was recalled on an emergency basis from his Junior team Val-d'Or Foreurs, and played his first game for the Oilers on March 20, 2007 against the Vancouver Canucks.

In his first two professional seasons, Bisaillon spent time between the Oilers' two affiliates, the Springfield Falcons of the AHL, and the Stockton Thunder of the ECHL.

On September 3, 2009 Bisaillon signed as a free agent with the Kassel Huskies of the Deutsche Eishockey Liga for the 2009–10 season. Due to the Huskies folding at the end of the campaign Bisaillon secured a try-out with the Montreal Canadiens for the 2010–11 season. On September 27, 2010, Bisaillon was assigned to the Canadiens AHL affiliate the Hamilton Bulldogs before being reassigned again to the ECHL.

Bisaillon left Diables Rouges de Briançon in April 2014 to sign with the Ducs d'Angers. In 2015, he signed with Brûleurs de Loups.

Prior to the 2015–16 season, Bisaillon was named an alternate captain for Brûleurs de Loups. He re-signed with Brûleurs de Loups on April 30, 2018 for the 2018–19 season.

Career statistics

Regular season and playoffs

References

External links
 

1986 births
Living people
Brûleurs de Loups players
Canadian ice hockey defencemen
Canadian expatriate ice hockey players in Germany
Diables Rouges de Briançon players
Ducs d'Angers players
Edmonton Oilers players
Graz 99ers players
Hamilton Bulldogs (AHL) players
Ice hockey people from Quebec
Kassel Huskies players
People from Mont-Laurier
Springfield Falcons players
Stockton Thunder players
Undrafted National Hockey League players
Val-d'Or Foreurs players
Wheeling Nailers players